The 1993 UCLA Bruins softball team represented the University of California, Los Angeles in the 1993 NCAA Division I softball season.  The Bruins were coached by Sharron Backus, who led her nineteenth season and Sue Enquist, in her fifth season, in an uncommonly used co-head coach system.  The Bruins played their home games at Sunset Field and finished with a record of 50–5.  They competed in the Pacific-10 Conference, where they finished first with a 25–1 record.

The Bruins were invited to the 1993 NCAA Division I softball tournament, where they swept the Regional and then completed a run to the title game of the Women's College World Series where they fell to champion Arizona.

Personnel

Roster

Coaches

Schedule

References

UCLA
UCLA Bruins softball seasons
1993 in sports in California
Women's College World Series seasons
Pac-12 Conference softball champion seasons